Jkvr. Judith Juliëtte Madeleine Sophie "Madeleen" Leyten-de Wijkerslooth de Weerdesteyn (29 September 1935 – 9 June 2016) was a Dutch politician.

She was born in Zwolle and joined the Catholic People's Party (KVP) in 1959. For this party she was member of the States of North Brabant between 1970 and 1978. The KVP was absorbed by Christian Democratic Appeal in 1980. She represented CDA for the rest of her political career serving in the Senate from 1980 to 1987 and the Council of State from 1987 to 2002.

She died in The Hague in 2016 at the age of 80.

References

1935 births
2016 deaths
Catholic People's Party politicians
20th-century Dutch politicians
Christian Democratic Appeal politicians
Members of the Council of State (Netherlands)
Members of the Provincial Council of North Brabant
Members of the Senate (Netherlands)
People from Zwolle
Jonkvrouws of the Netherlands